The Greatest!! Count Basie Plays, Joe Williams Sings Standards is an album by vocalist Joe Williams and pianist/bandleader Count Basie and His Orchestra recorded in 1956 and released on the Verve label. It was Williams' second album with Basie following Count Basie Swings, Joe Williams Sings.

Reception

AllMusic awarded the album 3 stars.

Track listing
"Thou Swell" (Lorenz Hart, Richard Rodgers) – 2:19
"There Will Never Be Another You" (Mack Gordon, Harry Warren) – 2:48
"Love Is Here to Stay" (George Gershwin, Ira Gershwin) – 3:38
"'S Wonderful" (Gershwin, Gershwin) – 2:35
"My Baby Just Cares for Me" (Walter Donaldson, Gus Kahn) – 2:24
"Nevertheless (I'm in Love with You)" (Bert Kalmar, Harry Ruby) – 3:54
"Singin' in the Rain" (Nacio Herb Brown, Arthur Freed) – 2:25
"I'm Beginning to See the Light" (Duke Ellington, Don George, Johnny Hodges) – 3:04
"A Fine Romance" (Dorothy Fields, Jerome Kern) – 2:28
"Come Rain or Come Shine" (Harold Arlen, Johnny Mercer) – 3:58
"I Can't Believe That You're in Love with Me" (Clarence Gaskill, Jimmy McHugh) – 2:38
"This Can't Be Love" (Hart, Rodgers) – 2:32
Recorded at Capitol Studios in Hollywood, CA, on April 28, 1956 (tracks 2, 3 & 6-9) and May 1, 1956 (tracks 1, 4, 5 & 10-12)

Personnel 
 Joe Williams - vocals
Count Basie - piano
Wendell Culley, Reunald Jones, Thad Jones, Joe Newman - trumpet
Henry Coker, Bill Hughes, Benny Powell - trombone
Marshall Royal - alto saxophone, clarinet
Bill Graham - alto saxophone
Frank Wess - alto saxophone, tenor saxophone, flute, clarinet
Frank Foster - tenor saxophone, clarinet
Charlie Fowlkes - baritone saxophone, bass clarinet
Freddie Green - guitar 
Eddie Jones - bass
Sonny Payne - drums
Buddy Bregman - arranger, conductor

References 

1956 albums
Count Basie Orchestra albums
Joe Williams (jazz singer) albums
Verve Records albums
Albums arranged by Buddy Bregman
Albums conducted by Buddy Bregman
Albums produced by Norman Granz

Albums recorded at Capitol Studios